Cottenham Village College is an academy school located in Cottenham, Cambridgeshire, England. The school offers secondary education to pupils from the surrounding area. In addition, as part of Cambridgeshire's village college structure, Cottenham offers adult education courses and leisure facilities for the local community.

Cottenham Village College and The Centre School were run by the Cottenham Academy Trust. However, the Trust was then taken over by the Astrea Academy Trust based in Sheffield. The CEO of Astrea is  Libby Nicholas.

Cottenham Village College primarily serves 11-16 year olds in the villages of Cottenham, Waterbeach and Willingham. The college is non-selective and takes students of all abilities, following the Local Authority's admission policy and procedures.

The Centre School
The Centre School is also located on the Cottenham Village College site. It is a BESD special school providing education for approximately 50 statemented students aged 11 to 16 from across Cambridgeshire. The school opened in January 2009.

External links
 Cottenham Village College homepage
 The Centre School homepage

Secondary schools in Cambridgeshire
Academies in Cambridgeshire
Village College